Elizabeth A. Hawver Niles (January 22, 1842 - September 13, 1920) served for the Union Army in the American Civil War, along with her husband.

Biography 
Elizabeth Hawver was born in White Creek, New York, on January 22, 1842. She cut her hair, and joined her husband in battle. There are several other "Niles'" listed in the rosters for the 13th and 14th infantries, and it is likely that Elizabeth was one of them, under a male name. Throughout her service, she participated in many battles, including the Battle of Gaines's Mill, the First Battle of Bull Run, the Battle of Antietam, and the Battle of Gettysburg. She remained undetected by the other soldiers or officers, and was mustered out with her husband on September 7, 1864. Following the war, they had 7 children together, and Martin died in 1889, leaving her with 5 children still in her care. She moved to Raritan, New Jersey, where she died on October 4, 1920, at the age of 92.

See also 
 Frances Clayton
 Catherine E. Davidson
 Mary Owens
 List of female American Civil War soldiers

References

External links 
 Elizabeth A. Hawver Niles Grave

1842 births
1920 deaths
Women in the American Civil War
Union Army soldiers
Women soldiers
Female wartime cross-dressers in the American Civil War